9-Nor-9β-hydroxyhexahydrocannabinol (9-Nor-9beta-HHC, sometimes incorrectly confused with 11-nor-9β-hydroxyhexahydrocannabinol),is a cannabinoid first discovered from early modifications to the structure of THC, in a search for the simplest compound that could still fulfill the binding requirements to produce cannabis-like activity. 

11-Hydroxyhexahydrocannabinol is the structurally related methylene homologue of 11-Nor-9β-hydroxyhexahydrocannabinol that has been found as a minor active metabolite of tetrahydrocannabinol, and also a metabolite of the trace cannabinoid hexahydrocannabinol.

See also 
 AM-2389
 9-Hydroxyhexahydrocannabinol
 Hexahydrocannabinol 
 11-Hydroxyhexahydrocannabinol
 HU-243
 Nabilone

References 

Cannabinoids
Benzochromenes
Cyclohexanols
Phenols